Lawrencega is a genus of melanoblossiid camel spiders, first described by Carl Friedrich Roewer in 1933.

Species 
, the World Solifugae Catalog accepts the following seven species:

 Lawrencega hamiltoni Lawrence, 1972 — Namibia
 Lawrencega hewitti (Lawrence, 1929) — South Africa
 Lawrencega longitarsis Lawrence, 1967 — Namibia
 Lawrencega minuta Wharton, 1981 — Namibia
 Lawrencega procera Wharton, 1981 — Namibia
 Lawrencega solaris Wharton, 1981 — Namibia
 Lawrencega tripilosa Lawrence, 1968 — South Africa

References 

Arachnid genera
Solifugae